Citrus × amblycarpa is an artificial hybrid species of citrus lime. It has the hybrid formula Citrus daoxianensis × Citrus hystrix.

Common names 

Characteristics 
The species grows in hot, humid, tropical regions at altitudes up to 350 meters above sealevel. It can grow to between 3 and 7 meters in height. Amblycarpa leaves are dark green and oblong in shape. Its flowers are white and fragrant, and its fruits are green with a rough peel and juicy fresh, similar to other limes.

The fruits are widely popular as aromatic and flavor-enhancing fruits in Indonesia. The juice of half-ripened fruits is sour, and is used to flavor Indonesian condiments such as sambal olek, and added to dishes such as soto. A 2020 study suggested the peels of these fruits could have anti-diabetic effects, while a 2017 study found that the trees had good commercial potential as ornamental pot trees.

References

amblycarpa
Plants described in 1917
Citrus hybrids